Peter Schrager (born April 20, 1982) is a sportscaster on Fox Sports and NFL Network. Schrager serves as an analyst on Fox NFL Kickoff as well as a Sideline Reporter on Fox Sports. In addition to his gameday coverage, he is a regular contributor to The Herd with Colin Cowherd and The Dan Patrick Show. Peter also stars alongside Kyle Brandt, Jason McCourty, and Jamie Erdahl on NFL Network's popular weekday morning show Good Morning Football.

Born to a Jewish family in Freehold Township, New Jersey, Schrager graduated from Freehold Township High School and Emory University.

In addition to his work with FOX Sports and the NFL Network, Schrager is also the author of two books: Strength of a Champion with O. J. Brigance (2013), and the New York Times Best Seller, Out of the Blue with Victor Cruz (2012).  Schrager has also worked as an editorial contributor for Showtime's Inside the NFL, which earned a Sports Emmy in 2013 for Outstanding Studio Show – Weekly.

References

1982 births
Living people
Fox Sports 1 people
Freehold Township High School alumni
People from Freehold Township, New Jersey
Emory University alumni
Jewish American sportspeople
21st-century American Jews